Ateviridine is a non-nucleoside reverse transcriptase inhibitor that has been studied for the treatment of HIV.

Synthesis

Preparation of the pyridylpiperazine moiety starts by aromatic displacement of chlorine from 2-chloro-3-nitropyridine by piperazine to give 3. The secondary amine is then protected as its BOC derivative by reaction with di-tert-butyl dicarbonate (Boc anhydride) to give 4. The nitro group is then reduced by catalytic hydrogenation. Reductive alkylation with acetaldehyde in the presence of lithium cyanoborohydride gives the corresponding N-ethyl derivative. The protecting group is then removed by reaction with TFA. Reaction of the resulting amine with the imidazolide derivative of 5-methoxy-3-indoleacetic acid produces the amide reverse transcriptase inhibitor, atevirdine.

See also
Delavirdine

References

Abandoned drugs
Carboxamides
Indole ethers at the benzene ring
Non-nucleoside reverse transcriptase inhibitors
Piperazines
Aminopyridines